Basketball contests at the 1964 Summer Olympics was the sixth appearance of the sport of basketball as an official Olympic medal event. It took place at the Yoyogi National Gymnasium in Tokyo, Japan from October 11 to October 23. The United States defeated the Soviet Union to win their sixth consecutive gold medal at this event, while Brazil earned the bronze against Puerto Rico.

Results

Qualification
Automatic qualifications were granted to the host country and the first eight places at the previous tournament. Additional spots were decided by various continental tournaments held by FIBA plus two additional intercontinental tournaments that granted six extra berths total, after the withdrawal of United Arab Republic and Czechoslovakia.

 Withdrew from the tournament.
 Replacement teams.

Format
 Two groups of eight teams are formed, where the top two from each group compete for the medals in a knockout round.
 The remaining places are defined as follows:
Fifth through eighth places are decided in a separate bracket between the third and fourth places from each group in a separate bracket.
Ninth through sixteenth places are decided between the fifth through eighth places from each group in separate brackets.

Squads
For the team rosters see: Basketball at the 1964 Summer Olympics – Men's team rosters.

Preliminary round
The top two teams from each group advance to the semifinals, while the remaining teams compete for 5th through 16th places in separate brackets. Both group leaders, the United States and the Soviet Union advanced undefeated to the knockout stage.

Group A

October 11

October 12

October 13

October 14

October 16

October 17

October 18

Group B

October 11

October 12

October 13

October 14

October 16

October 17

October 18

Knockout stage

Championship playoffs

Classification brackets
5th–8th Place

9th–12th Place

13th–16th Place

Awards

Final standings

References

 
1964 Summer Olympics events
1964
Olympics